Henry III of Bar (1259 – Naples, September 1302) was Count of Bar from 1291 to 1302. He was the son of Theobald II, Count of Bar and Jeanne de Toucy.

Henry's introduction to military life came as he was made a knight in a conflict between his father and the Bishop of Metz. He then served Frederick III, Duke of Lorraine. He was preparing to go on crusade when his father died.

In 1284 Joan I of Navarre, Countess of Champagne married the future Philip IV of France.  Henry's reaction was a marriage to Eleanor, daughter of Edward I of England. When war broke out in short order between France and England, Henry was drawn in. The fighting ceased after the 1301 Treaty of Bruges. Under its terms, Henry gave up some fortresses and paid homage to Philip for part of his lands, then called the Barrois mouvant. He also undertook to fight in Cyprus against the Muslim forces.

Henry therefore made his way to the Kingdom of Naples. In assisting Charles II of Naples against the invading forces of Frederick II of Sicily, he was wounded in fighting, and died soon afterwards.

Family 
Henry married Eleanor, daughter of Edward I of England and Eleanor of Castile, at Bristol on 20 September 1293. Their children were:
 Edward I, Count of Bar, married to Mary, daughter of Robert II, Duke of Burgundy 
 Joan of Bar, Countess of Surrey, married to John de Warenne, 7th Earl of Surrey.
 Eleanor (b.1285), married to a Welshman named Llywelyn ap Owain, Lord of South Wales and representative of the sovereign princes of South Wales.

References

Sources

1259 births
1302 deaths
House of Montbelliard
Counts of Bar